Chaetostoma marginatum is a species of catfish in the family Loricariidae. It is native to South America, where it occurs in the basins of the Bogotá River, the Chimbo River, and the San Juan River. The species reaches 19 cm (7.5 inches) SL.

References 

marginatum
Fish described in 1904